The list of episodes of the American sitcom Grace Under Fire. The series aired for five seasons, totaling 112 episodes, on ABC from September 1993 to February 1998.

Series overview

Episodes

Season 1 (1993–94)

Season 2 (1994–95)

Season 3 (1995–96)

Season 4 (1996–97)

Season 5 (1997–98)

External links
 
 Carsey/Werner.net - Grace Under Fire Episode Synopses

Lists of American sitcom episodes